Timothy Browning is a mathematician working in number theory, examining the interface of analytic number theory and Diophantine geometry.
Browning is currently a Professor of number theory at the Institute of Science and Technology Austria (ISTA) in Klosterneuburg, Austria.

Awards 

In 2008, Browning was awarded the Whitehead Prize by the London Mathematical Society for his significant contributions on the interface of analytic number theory and arithmetic geometry concerning the number and distribution of rational and integral solutions to Diophantine equations.

In 2009, Browning won the Ferran Sunyer i Balaguer Prize. The prize is awarded for a mathematical monograph of an expository nature presenting the latest developments in an active area of research in Mathematics, in which the applicant has made important contributions. Browning won the prize for his monograph entitled Quantitative Arithmetic of Projective Varieties.

In 2010, Browning was awarded the Leverhulme Mathematics Prize for his work on number theory and diophantine geometry.

Publications

References 

1976 births
Academics of the University of Bristol
Living people
Whitehead Prize winners
Alumni of the University of Oxford
20th-century British mathematicians
21st-century British mathematicians
Number theorists
Geometers